Jamie Dobie (born 7 June 2001) is a Scotland international rugby union player. He plays for Glasgow Warriors at the scrum-half position.

Rugby union career

Amateur career

Dobie started his rugby career playing minis for Highland.

Dobie played for his school team Merchiston Castle School before signing for Glasgow Warriors. He won the Scottish Schools Cup Final at Murrayfield Stadium with his school team in December 2018, beating George Watson’s College in the final.

Dobie secured a Stage 1 place in the Scottish Rugby Academy in the 2017–18 season. The following year he remained in the Academy at Stage 2.

Dobie then bypassed the expected progression route; which was a Stage 3 professional contract with the Scottish Rugby Academy for the 2019–20 season. A Stage 3 contract would have given the player a placement with a professional club; with a chance to earn a professional club contract on good performances.

Dobie won the award of most 'Exciting Prospect' at the 2018 Offside Line End of Year awards. He was courted by a number of English Premiership clubs.

Professional career

On 30 April 2019 it was announced that Dobie had signed a professional deal with Glasgow Warriors. He is the first player that the Warriors have signed directly from school; and the first player from the Scottish Rugby Academy to sign a professional contract with a professional club direct from Stage 2 – without needing to move to the Stage 3 placement.

Head Coach Dave Rennie stated: "It’s uncommon for a player to be signed straight from school, but Jamie is one of the most exciting young talents in the country and we believe he’s ready to thrive in a professional environment."

Dobie has signed a two-year deal which will keep him at Scotstoun till 2021. Dobie re-signed with Glasgow to stay for 2+ years in 2021.

Dobie made his debut for Glasgow Warriors against Ulster Rugby on 7 September 2019 at the Kingspan Stadium. He followed that up with another appearance against Ulster on 14 September 2019 at Scotstoun Stadium.

Dobie made his first Pro14 appearance against the Cheetahs in South Africa on 27 September 2019.

International career

Dobie has been capped at Scotland U16s and Scotland U18s. Dobie received his first call up to the senior Scotland squad in February 2021 for the 2021 Six Nations Championship.

Dobie made his Scotland debut against Tonga on 30 October 2021. Scotland won the match 60 - 14.

References 

2001 births
Living people
People educated at Merchiston Castle School
Glasgow Warriors players
Highland RFC players
Rugby union players from Inverness
Rugby union scrum-halves
Scotland international rugby union players
Scottish rugby union players
Bay of Plenty rugby union players